The 59th Oza is one of the main Go tournaments in 2011. It began on 13 January 2011. The winner of the challenger tournament faced the title-holder Cho U.

Challenger Tournament

Finals

See also 

 List of professional Go tournaments
 Go players
 List of Go organizations

References

2011 in go
Ōza (Go)